This is a list of foreign ministers in 2011.

Africa
 Algeria - Mourad Medelci (2007–2013)
 Angola - Georges Rebelo Chicoti (2010–2017)
 Benin -
 Jean-Marie Ehouzou (2008–2011)
 Nassirou Bako Arifari (2011–2015)
 Botswana - Phandu Skelemani (2008–2014)
 Burkina Faso -
 Alain Bédouma Yoda (2008–2011)
 Djibril Bassolé (2011–2014)
 Burundi -
 Augustin Nsanze (2009–2011)
 Laurent Kavakure (2011–2015)
 Cameroon -
 Henri Eyebe Ayissi (2007–2011)
 Pierre Moukoko Mbonjo (2011–2015)
 Cape Verde -
 José Brito (2008–2011)
 Jorge Borges (2011–2014)
 Central African Republic - Antoine Gambi (2009–2013)
 Chad - Moussa Faki (2008–2017)
 Comoros -
 Fahmi Said Ibrahim El Maceli (2010–2011)
 Mohamed Bakri Ben Abdoulfatah Charif (2011–2013)
 Republic of Congo - Basile Ikouébé (2007–2015)
 Democratic Republic of Congo - Alexis Thambwe Mwamba (2008–2012)
 Côte d'Ivoire -
 Alcide Djédjé (2010–2011) (Gbagbo government)
 Jean-Marie Kacou Gervais (2010–2011) (Ouattara government)
 Daniel Kablan Duncan (2011–2012)
 Djibouti - Mahamoud Ali Youssouf (2005–present)
 Egypt -
 Ahmed Aboul Gheit (2004–2011)
 Nabil Elaraby (2011)
 Mohamed Orabi (2011)
 Mohamed Kamel Amr (2011–2013)
 Equatorial Guinea - Pastor Micha Ondó Bile (2003–2012)
 Eritrea - Osman Saleh Mohammed (2007–present)
 Ethiopia - Hailemariam Desalegn (2010–2012)
 Gabon - Paul Toungui (2008–2012)
 The Gambia - Mamadou Tangara (2010–2012)
 Ghana - Muhammad Mumuni (2009–2013)
 Guinea - Edouard Niankoye Lamah (2010–2012)
 Guinea-Bissau -
 Adelino Mano Quetá (2009–2011)
 Mamadu Saliu Djaló Pires (2011–2012)
 Kenya -
 Moses Wetangula (2008–2012)
 George Saitoti (acting) (2010–2011)
 Lesotho - Mohlabi Tsekoa (2007–2015)
 Liberia - Toga McIntosh (2010–2012)
 Libya -
 Moussa Koussa (2009–2011)
 Abdul Ati al-Obeidi (2011)
 Ali Abd-al-Aziz al-Isawi (2011)
 Mahmoud Jibril (2011)
 Ashour Bin Khayal (2011–2012)
 Madagascar -
 Hyppolite Ramaroson (2010–2011)
 Yvette Sylla (2011)
 Pierrot Rajaonarivelo (2011–2013)
 Malawi -
 Etta Banda (2009–2011)
 Bingu wa Mutharika (2011)
 Peter Mutharika (2011–2012)
 Mali -
 Moctar Ouane (2004–2011)
 Soumeylou Boubèye Maïga (2011–2013)
 Mauritania -
 Naha Mint Mouknass (2009–2011)
 Hamadi Ould Baba Ould Hamadi (2011–2013)
 Mauritius - Arvin Boolell (2008–2014)
 Morocco - Taieb Fassi Fihri (2007–2012)
 Western Sahara - Mohamed Salem Ould Salek (1998–2023)
 Mozambique - Oldemiro Balói (2008–2017)
 Namibia - Utoni Nujoma (2010–2012)
 Niger -
 Aminatou Maïga Touré (2010–2011)
 Mohamed Bazoum (2011–2015)
 Nigeria -
 Henry Odein Ajumogobia (2010–2011)
 Olugbenga Ashiru (2011–2013)
 Rwanda - Louise Mushikiwabo (2009–2018)
 São Tomé and Príncipe - Manuel Salvador dos Ramos (2010–2012)
 Senegal - Madické Niang (2009–2012)
 Seychelles - Jean-Paul Adam (2010–2015)
 Sierra Leone - J. B. Dauda (2010–2012)
 Somalia - Mohamed Abdullahi Omaar (2010–2012)
 Somaliland - Abdillahi Mohamed Omer (2010–2013)
 Puntland - Daud Mohamed Omar (2010–2014)
 South Africa - Maite Nkoana-Mashabane (2009–2018)
 South Sudan -
 Deng Alor (2011)
 Nhial Deng Nhial (2011–2013)
 Sudan - Ali Karti (2010–2015)
 Swaziland -
 Lutfo Dlamini (2008–2011)
 Mtiti Fakudze (2011–2013)
 Tanzania – Bernard Membe (2007–2015)
 Togo - Elliott Ohin (2010–2013)
 Tunisia -
 Kamel Morjane (2010–2011)
 Ahmed Ounaies (2011)
 Mouldi Kefi (2011)
 Rafik Abdessalem (2011–2013)
 Uganda -
 Sam Kutesa (2005–2021)
 Henry Oryem Okello (acting) (2011–2012)
 Zambia -
 Kabinga Pande (2007–2011)
 Chishimba Kambwili (2011–2012)
 Zimbabwe - Simbarashe Mumbengegwi (2005–present)

Asia
 Afghanistan - Zalmai Rassoul (2010–2013)
 Armenia - Eduard Nalbandyan (2008–2018)
 Azerbaijan - Elmar Mammadyarov (2004–2020)
 Nagorno-Karabakh -
 Georgy Petrosyan (2005–2011)
 Vasily Atajanyan (acting) (2011–2012)
 Bahrain - Sheikh Khalid ibn Ahmad Al Khalifah (2005–2020)
 Bangladesh – Dipu Moni (2009–2013)
 Bhutan - Ugyen Tshering (2008–2013)
 Brunei - Pengiran Muda Mohamed Bolkiah (1984–2015)
 Cambodia - Hor Namhong (1998–2016)
 China - Yang Jiechi (2007–2013)
 East Timor - Zacarias da Costa (2007–2012)
 Georgia - Grigol Vashadze (2008–2012)
 Abkhazia -
 Maxim Gvinjia (2010–2011)
 Viacheslav Chirikba (2011–2016)
 South Ossetia - Murat Dzhioyev (1998–2012)
 India - S. M. Krishna (2009–2012)
 Indonesia - Marty Natalegawa (2009–2014)
 Iran - Ali Akbar Salehi (2010–2013)
 Iraq - Hoshyar Zebari (2003–2014)
 Kurdistan - Falah Mustafa Bakir (2006–2019)
 Israel - Avigdor Lieberman (2009–2012)
 Palestinian Authority -Riyad al-Maliki (2007–present)
 Gaza Strip (in rebellion against the Palestinian National Authority) - Muhammad Awad (2011–2012)
 Japan -
 Seiji Maehara (2010–2011)
 Yukio Edano (acting) (2011)
 Takeaki Matsumoto (2011)
 Kōichirō Gemba (2011–2012)
 Jordan - Nasser Judeh (2009–2017)
 Kazakhstan –
 Kanat Saudabayev (2009–2011)
 Yerzhan Kazykhanov (2011–2012)
 North Korea - Pak Ui-chun (2007–2014)
 South Korea - Kim Sung-hwan (2010–2013)
 Kuwait -
 Sheikh Mohammad Sabah Al-Salem Al-Sabah (2003–2011)
 Ali al-Rashed (acting) (2011)
 Sheikh Sabah Al-Khalid Al-Sabah (2011–2019)
 Kyrgyzstan - Ruslan Kazakbayev (2010–2012)
 Laos - Thongloun Sisoulith (2006–2016)
 Lebanon -
 Ali Al Shami (2009–2011)
 Adnan Mansour (2011–2014)
 Malaysia - Anifah Aman (2009–2018)
 Maldives -
 Ahmed Shaheed (2008–2011)
 Ahmed Naseem (2011–2012)
 Mongolia - Gombojavyn Zandanshatar (2009–2012)
 Myanmar -
 Nyan Win (2004–2011)
 Wunna Maung Lwin (2011–2016)
 Nepal -
 Sujata Koirala (2009–2011)
 Narayan Kaji Shrestha (2011–2013)
 Oman - Yusuf bin Alawi bin Abdullah (1982–2020)
 Pakistan -
 Shah Mehmood Qureshi (2008–2011)
 Hina Rabbani Khar (2011–2013)
 Philippines -
 Alberto Romulo (2004–2011)
 Albert del Rosario (2011–2016)
 Qatar - Sheikh Hamad bin Jassim bin Jaber Al Thani (1992–2013)

 Saudi Arabia - Prince Saud bin Faisal bin Abdulaziz Al Saud (1975–2015)
 Singapore -
 George Yeo (2004–2011)
 K. Shanmugam (2011–2015)
 Sri Lanka - G. L. Peiris (2010–2015)
 Syria - Walid Muallem (2006–2020)
 Taiwan - Timothy Yang (2009–2012)
 Tajikistan - Khamrokhon Zaripov (2006–2013)
 Thailand -
 Kasit Piromya (2008–2011)
 Surapong Tovichakchaikul (2011–2014)
 Turkey - Ahmet Davutoğlu (2009–2014)
 Turkmenistan - Raşit Meredow (2001–present)
 United Arab Emirates - Sheikh Abdullah bin Zayed Al Nahyan (2006–present)
 Uzbekistan - Elyor Ganiyev (2010–2012)
 Vietnam -
 Phạm Gia Khiêm (2006–2011)
 Phạm Bình Minh (2011–2021)
 Yemen - Abu Bakr al-Qirbi (2001–2014)

Europe
 Albania - Edmond Haxhinasto (2010–2012)
 Andorra -
 Xavier Espot Miró (2009–2011)
 Gilbert Saboya Sunyé (2011–2017)
 Austria - Michael Spindelegger (2008–2013)
 Belarus - Sergei Martynov (2003–2012)
 Belgium -
 Steven Vanackere (2009–2011)
 Didier Reynders (2011–2019)
 Brussels-Capital Region - Jean-Luc Vanraes (2009–2013)
 Flanders - Kris Peeters (2008–2014)
 Wallonia - Rudy Demotte (2009–2014)
 Bosnia and Herzegovina - Sven Alkalaj (2007–2012)
 Bulgaria - Nickolay Mladenov (2010–2013)
 Croatia -
 Gordan Jandroković (2008–2011)
 Vesna Pusić (2011–2016)
 Cyprus -
 Markos Kyprianou (2008–2011)
 Erato Kozakou-Marcoullis (2011–2013)
 Northern Cyprus - Hüseyin Özgürgün (2009–2013)
 Czech Republic - Karel Schwarzenberg (2010–2013)
 Denmark -
 Lene Espersen (2010–2011)
 Villy Søvndal (2011–2013)
 Greenland - Kuupik Kleist (2009–2013)
 Faroe Islands -
 Jørgen Niclasen (2008–2011)
 Kaj Leo Johannesen (2011–2015)
 Estonia - Urmas Paet (2005–2014)
 Finland -
 Alexander Stubb (2008–2011)
 Erkki Tuomioja (2011–2015)
 France -
 Michèle Alliot-Marie (2010–2011)
 Alain Juppé (2011–2012)
 Germany - Guido Westerwelle (2009–2013)
 Greece -
 Dimitrios Droutsas (2010–2011)
 Stavros Lambrinidis (2011)
 Stavros Dimas (2011–2012)
 Hungary - János Martonyi (2010–2014)
 Iceland - Össur Skarphéðinsson (2009–2013)
 Ireland -
 Micheál Martin (2008–2011)
 Brian Cowen (2011)
 Eamon Gilmore (2011–2014)
 Italy -
 Franco Frattini (2008–2011)
 Giulio Terzi di Sant'Agata (2011–2013)
 Latvia -
 Ģirts Valdis Kristovskis (2010–2011)
 Edgars Rinkēvičs (2011–present)
 Liechtenstein - Aurelia Frick (2009–2019)
 Lithuania - Audronius Ažubalis (2010–2012)
 Luxembourg - Jean Asselborn (2004–present)
 Macedonia -
 Antonio Milošoski (2006–2011)
 Nikola Poposki (2011–2017)
 Malta - Tonio Borg (2008–2012)
 Moldova - Iurie Leancă (2009–2013)
 Transnistria - Vladimir Yastrebchak (2008–2012)
 Monaco -
 Franck Biancheri (2008–2011)
 José Badia (2011–2015)
 Montenegro - Milan Roćen (2006–2012)
 Netherlands - Uri Rosenthal (2010–2012)
 Norway - Jonas Gahr Støre (2005–2012)
 Poland - Radosław Sikorski (2007–2014)
 Portugal -
 Luís Amado (2006–2011)
 Paulo Portas (2011–2013)
 Romania - Teodor Baconschi (2009–2012)
 Russia - Sergey Lavrov (2004–present)
 San Marino - Antonella Mularoni (2008–2012)
 Serbia - Vuk Jeremić (2007–2012)
 Kosovo -
 Vlora Çitaku (acting) (2010–2011)
 Enver Hoxhaj (2011–2014)
 Slovakia - Mikuláš Dzurinda (2010–2012)
 Slovenia - Samuel Žbogar (2008–2012)
 Spain -
 Trinidad Jiménez (2010–2011)
 José Manuel García-Margallo (2011–2016)
 Sweden - Carl Bildt (2006–2014)
 Switzerland - Micheline Calmy-Rey (2003–2011)

 Ukraine - Kostyantyn Gryshchenko (2010–2012)
 United Kingdom - William Hague (2010–2014)
 Scotland - Fiona Hyslop (2009–2020)
 Vatican City - Archbishop Dominique Mamberti (2006–2014)

North America and the Caribbean
 Antigua and Barbuda - Baldwin Spencer (2005–2014)
 The Bahamas - Brent Symonette (2007–2012)
 Barbados - Maxine McClean (2008-2018)
 Belize - Wilfred Elrington (2008–2020)
 Canada -
 Lawrence Cannon (2008–2011)
 John Baird (2011–2015)
 Quebec - Monique Gagnon-Tremblay (2010–2012)
 Costa Rica -
 René Castro (2010–2011)
 Carlos Roverssi (acting) (2011)
 Enrique Castillo (2011–2014)
 Cuba - Bruno Rodríguez Parrilla (2009–present)
 Dominica - Roosevelt Skerrit (2010–2014)
 Dominican Republic - Carlos Morales Troncoso (2004–2014)
 El Salvador - Hugo Martínez (2009–2013)
 Grenada - Karl Hood (2010–2012)
 Guatemala - Haroldo Rodas (2008–2012)
 Haiti -
 Marie-Michèle Rey (2009–2011)
 Laurent Lamothe (2011–2012)
 Honduras -
 Mario Canahuati (2010–2011)
 Arturo Corrales (2011–2013)
 Jamaica - Kenneth Baugh (2007–2012)
 Mexico - Patricia Espinosa (2006–2012)
 Nicaragua - Samuel Santos López (2007–2017)
 Panama -
 Juan Carlos Varela (2009–2011)
 Roberto Henríquez (2011–2012)
 Puerto Rico – Kenneth McClintock (2009–2013)
 Saint Kitts and Nevis - Sam Condor (2010–2013)
 Saint Lucia -
 Rufus Bousquet (2009–2011)
 Alva Baptiste (2011–2016)
 Saint Vincent and the Grenadines - Douglas Slater (2010–2013)
 Trinidad and Tobago - Surujrattan Rambachan (2010–2012)
 United States of America - Hillary Clinton (2009–2013)

Oceania
 Australia - Kevin Rudd (2010–2012)
 Fiji - Ratu Inoke Kubuabola   (2009–2016)
 French Polynesia -
 Gaston Tong Sang (2009–2011)
 Oscar Temaru (2011–2013)
 Kiribati - Anote Tong (2003–2016)
 Marshall Islands - John Silk (2009–2012)
 Micronesia - Lorin S. Robert (2007–2019)
 Nauru -
 Kieren Keke (2007–2011)
 Mathew Batsiua (2011)
 Sprent Dabwido (2011–2012)
 New Zealand - Murray McCully (2008–2017)
 Cook Islands - Tom Marsters (2010–2013)
 Niue - Toke Talagi (2008–2020)
 Tokelau -
 Kuresa Nasau (2010–2011)
 Foua Toloa (2011–2012)
 Palau - Victor Yano (2010–2013)
 Papua New Guinea -
 Don Polye (2010–2011)
 Ano Pala (2011–2012)/Paru Aihi (2011–2012) (rival Somare government)
 Samoa - Tuilaepa Aiono Sailele Malielegaoi (1998–2021)
 Solomon Islands - Peter Shanel Agovaka (2010–2012)
 Tonga - Sialeʻataongo Tuʻivakanō (2010–2014)
 Tuvalu - Apisai Ielemia (2010–2013)
 Vanuatu -
 George Wells (2010–2011)
 Joe Natuman (2011)
 George Wells (2011)
 Alfred Carlot (2011)
 Joe Natuman (2011)
 Alfred Carlot (2011–2013)

South America
 Argentina - Héctor Timerman (2010–2015)
 Bolivia - David Choquehuanca (2006–2017)
 Brazil -
Celso Amorim (2003–2011)
Antonio Patriota (2011–2013)
 Chile - Alfredo Moreno Charme (2010–2014)
 Colombia - María Ángela Holguín (2010–2018)
 Ecuador - Ricardo Patiño (2010–2016)
 Guyana - Carolyn Rodrigues (2008–2015)
 Paraguay -
 Héctor Lacognata (2009–2011)
 Jorge Lara Castro (2011–2012)
 Peru -
 José Antonio García Belaúnde (2006–2011)
 Rafael Roncagliolo (2011–2013)
 Suriname - Winston Lackin (2010–2015)
 Uruguay - Luis Almagro (2010–2015)
 Venezuela - Nicolás Maduro (2006–2013)

References
http://rulers.org

Foreign ministers
2011 in international relations

Foreign ministers
2011